Xabier Aldanondo Luzuriaga (born 6 April 1967) is a Spanish former racing cyclist. He rode in the 1992 Tour de France and three editions of the Giro d'Italia. He competed in the team time trial at the 1988 Summer Olympics.

References

External links
 

1967 births
Living people
Spanish male cyclists
Olympic cyclists of Spain
Cyclists at the 1988 Summer Olympics
People from Goierri
Sportspeople from Gipuzkoa
Cyclists from the Basque Country (autonomous community)